Call It Love is an ongoing South Korean television series starring Lee Sung-kyung and Kim Young-kwang. It is a romantic melodrama about a woman whose life goes downhill after finding out about her father's affair and falling in love with his mistress's son. It premiered on February 22, 2023, on Disney+ in selected territories.

Synopsis 
Woo-joo's life hits rock bottom when she learns about her father's infidelity. After the father dies, she is kicked out of her family home by her father’s mistress. Woo-joo plans to take revenge, but she falls in love with Dong-jin, the son of the mistress of her late father.

Cast

Main 
 Lee Sung-kyung as Shim Woo-joo
 Kim Young-kwang as Han Dong-jin
 Sung Joon as Yoon-jun
 Ahn Hee-yeon as Kang Min-yeong
 Kim Ye-won as Shim Hye-seong

Supporting 
 Seo Dong-won as Cha Young-min
 Park Jin-ah as Hyun Ji-hyung
 Yeon Je-hyung as Kang-gun
 Nam Gi-ae as Ma Hee-ja

References

External links 
 
 
 
 Call It Love at Daum 

Star (Disney+) original programming
Disney+ original programming
Korean-language television shows
2023 South Korean television series debuts
South Korean melodrama television series
South Korean romance television series